The 2022 Italian Basketball Supercup, also known as Frecciarossa Supercoppa 2022 for sponsorship reasons, is the 28th edition of the super cup tournament, organized by the Lega Basket Serie A (LBA). The title was won by Virtus Segafredo Bologna, which defeated 72–69 Banco di Sardegna Sassari, achieving a back-to-back following the 2021 title.

Participant teams

Source:

Final Four

Semifinals

Bertram Yachts Derthona Tortona vs. Banco di Sardegna Sassari

EA7 Emporio Armani Milano vs. Virtus Segafredo Bologna

Final

Banco di Sardegna Sassari vs. Virtus Segafredo Bologna

Sponsors

References

External links
 LBA Supercoppa official website

Italian Basketball Cup
2022–23 in Italian basketball